Lemmings is a 2006 video game developed by Team17 and published by Sony Computer Entertainment. It is a remake of the original Lemmings released in 1991.

The game has been released in slightly different versions for PlayStation Portable, PlayStation 2, and PlayStation 3.

Gameplay
The PSP version featured all 120 levels from the original game, 36 brand new levels as well as expansion pack support, and a user level editor. Every level in the game was a pre-rendered 3D landscape, although their gameplay was still 2D and remains faithful to the original game. User levels could be constructed from pre-rendered objects and distributed by uploading them to a PlayStation-specific Lemmings online community.

In October 2006 the game was ported by developer Rusty Nutz for the PlayStation 2 with use of the EyeToy. While being recorded by the EyeToy, players stretch and move their limbs to aid the lemmings. In 2007, Team17 produced a similar remake of Lemmings for the PlayStation 3 for download through the PlayStation Network. The game had the similar graphical improvements as the PSP title, as well as online scoreboards and additional levels developed for high-definition display, but lacked the ability to create and share levels as the PSP version offered.

Reception

The PSP version received generally positive reviews, whereas the PS3 version of the game attained mostly mixed reviews. The PSP version holds a Metacritic score of 76/100 based on 46 critics, indicating "generally favorable reviews". The PS3 version holds a Metacritic score of 59/100 based on 8 critics, indicating "mixed or average reviews".

IGN gave the PSP version of the game 7.8/10, praising the graphics and the enhanced longevity given by the editor, but criticizing the unexciting sound. The PS3 version received a score of 7.5/10, with the comment "It doesn't reinvent the wheel, but it rolls just fine."

GameSpot gave the PSP version of the game 8/10, praising the polished visuals and audio, the level designer and the online sharing feature. The PS3 version received a slightly lower score because of it missing the level editor and level sharing of the PSP version.

Notes

References

External links
 
 
 

2006 video games
PlayStation 3 games
PlayStation 2 games
PlayStation Network games
PlayStation Portable games
Lemmings games
Video games developed in the United Kingdom
Video games scored by Tim Follin
Team17 games
Video game remakes
Sony Interactive Entertainment games